Vulkanwerft concentration camp  in the Bredow district of Szczecin, also known as the KZ Stettin-Bredow, was one of the early so-called "wild" German Nazi concentration camps set up by the SA (or the SS by different source), in October 1933. The camp existed only until 11 March 1934, before prisoner transfer, and in spite of its short history, had as many as three commandants including SS-Truppführer Otto Meier, SS-Truppführer Karl Salis, and SS-Truppführer Fritz Pleines. The camp was notorious for the brutality of its guards. The prisoners were kept in the basement of the shipyard buildings.

Other early concentration camps 
Breitenau concentration camp (1933–1934)
Breslau-Dürrgoy concentration camp in Wrocław, Poland 
Esterwegen concentration camp
Kemna concentration camp
Oranienburg concentration camp
Sonnenburg concentration camp

See also 
 
 The Holocaust
 List of books about Nazi Germany
 List of concentration and internment camps
 List of Nazi-German concentration camps
 Nazi concentration camps
 Nazi Party
 Nazi songs
 World War II
 
 The United States Holocaust Memorial Museum Encyclopedia of Camps and Ghettos, 1933-1945, vol. 1

Notes

Citations

1930s in Prussia
Nazi concentration camps in Poland